Venus Williams was the defending champion and defended her title by defeating Victoria Azarenka 6–3, 7–5 in the finals.

Seeds
The top eight seeds receive a bye into the second round.

Draw

Finals

Top half

Section 1

Section 2

Bottom half

Section 3

Section 4

External links
 WTA tournament draws

2010 Dubai Tennis Championships
Dubai Tennis Championships - Women's Singles